Toward the Light (in Danish, Vandrer mod Lyset!) was first published in Copenhagen, Denmark in 1920 by the Danish author Michael Agerskov. The content of the book is said to have been received through intuitive thought-inspiration from the transcendental world by Michael Agerskov's wife, Johanne Agerskov, who was an intermediary. Johanne Agerskov was the daughter of the Danish inventor Rasmus Malling-Hansen.

The three golden fruits 
The couple were not pursuing the occult, but were inspired by intelligences in the transcendental world. They became involved with spiritist circles in the beginning of the 20th century, and soon experienced some extraordinary events. At the request of the transcendental world, Johanne Agerskov agreed to be a mediator, as before her birth she had promised to be instrumental in bringing some eternal truths to mankind. The Agerskovs, together with two other couples, formed a circle, and during light time séances they claim to have had spiritual contact with spirits of the Light. The circle was asked to form questions concerning ethics, religion and science. During the séances, Johanne Agerskov was given answers to the questions by the means of intuitive thought-inspiration. Very early in their work, they were told that the work was initiated by God, Himself, and that they would be given "three golden fruits" (the books).

The spirit lives on after the death of the body 
The first "golden fruit" turned out to be a collection of poems written by deceased Danish poets. Johanne Agerskov's spirit learned the poems by heart during her sleep, and the day after, the poem was transferred to her physical brain through inspiration while she was awake. The purpose of the poems was to prove that the human spirit never dies, but lives on after the death of the physical body. The book of poems was published by Michael Agerskov in 1915, with the title Hilsen til Danmark (Greetings to Denmark), and was sent out to a great number of literary skilled people. The hope was that they would recognize the authors of the poems based on their knowledge of the poet's literary works as human beings. Unfortunately, the expected reaction failed to appear, and the publishing of the book did not lead to any public interest to any extent. The few people who publicly mentioned the book suggested the probability that the poems were written by either Johanne or Michael Agerskov, themselves, or maybe by their subconscious selves.

A message to mankind 
The second "golden fruit" was the great ethical, religious, philosophic and scientific work, Toward the Light, published in 1920. This book was the result of weekly seances during 1913–1918, and is said to be a message to mankind from the transcendental world. The content is divided into several parts.

Preface
Ardor's Account
Speech of Christ
Speech of God's Servant
Parables
Commentary to Ardor's Account
Concluding Summary
Postscript

In Ardor's Account, the spirit formerly known as Lucifer, who has now returned to the Kingdom of God, in solemn and poetic language, tells the story of how time began, and about the two primeval powers of the universe, the Light and the Darkness. In the Light rested the possibilities of the good, and in the Darkness rested the possibilities of evil. Ardor tells how God and His 12 servants arose from the Light, about the creation of the planets, and of the angels, God's first children. And they lived a life of joy and splendor with no worries in God's Kingdom. Then God created our planet, the Earth, and He wanted to give to the angels the task of guiding the immature spirits He planned to create in their wandering toward greater maturity. When He told this to the angels, some of them could not resist the self-admiring thought that they must be God's chosen ones. They went to the beautiful planet on their own, not being aware that they had fallen into Darkness, and that in their glorification of themselves, they had released the darkness, which little by little streamed all over the planet and destroyed the lovely landscape. The fallen angels, called "the Eldest," soon began to experiment with the darkness, to see if they could themselves recreate what the darkness had destroyed, and to create their own beings, who would obey them.

Thus, they created the first man, and hoped that he and his fellow men would be able to control the Darkness. But the humans were afraid, and escaped from the evil they felt from the Eldest. When they saw the sun, they held out their arms and asked for help. When the humans died, their spirits arose from their bodies, but the Eldest had not been able to give them Thought and a Will, and they continued as shadows — alive, but still dead, without consciousness. These zombies eventually outnumbered the living humans, wandering the earth like an army of ghosts. When the Eldest saw this, some of them felt terrible about what their experiments with the darkness had led to, and they pitied their creations. When God called for them, they asked Him to help their creatures, and God agreed to take responsibility for the humans. He gave all the dead spirits a spark of divine light, and gave them Will and Thought, and they became conscious beings. And God made laws for man's existence, ordaining that they again and again must incarnate on earth, to grow in maturity until they have learned to resist the darkness. Upon maturity, they will end their living on earth, and continue their development toward the kingdom of God.

The task of guiding the human beings in their development, God gave to the angels who had remained in his kingdom. The task was such a challenge that the angels did not know whether they would be able to leave the kingdom of the light to live again and again in the darkness of the earth for so long. But then one of them stepped forward and said that he would take on the task — and he became the leader of the Youngest, as these angels came to be called. And God made worlds around the earth for the Youngest to live in while they teach the human spirits during their rest between incarnations, and as they guide them during their lives on the earth. God chose among the Youngest the first ones to be incarnated as humans, and allowed them to incarnate with a small part of their genius minds available; enough to make them pioneers among the humans. Their task was to bring the human kind forward in all areas. In history we know these Youngest as pioneers; wise and strong leaders, religious reformers, inventors, and brilliant artists.

When the Eldest saw what happened, they decided to work against the Youngest. They had become slaves of the darkness, and they would not give up their world of darkness without a fight. In history we know them as cruel and evil persons, and power-seeking, unscrupulous leaders. In this way a great struggle between light and darkness began. The leader of the Youngest, who worked with God, was Christ; and the leader of the Eldest, the prince of the darkness, became known as the Devil.

Then comes the speech of Christ, in which he stands out as the leader of all human beings and promises that he will not give up on anyone before they all are assembled in God's kingdom. He urges us to follow him, and to reject the darkness. The picture that is drawn of God is of the almighty, all-loving father of our spirit, whose love for us is without limits. He would never let any of us be doomed to be eternally lost. Everyone, in the end, will be gathered in God's kingdom; but it is up to each one of us to determine how long or short our road will be.

And then there is a speech made by one of God's servants; one of the twelve spirits that God created in His mind even before He was Himself embodied. The speech takes the form of an intense prayer to mankind, to grow in maturity and to stop the gruesome wars on Earth.

After a number of parables, follows the Commentary, where all the topics of Ardor's Account are further explained. Many more details are given from the development of human life on earth, the early cultures, the sending to the earth of the leader of mankind, Christ, and his life as Jesus of Nazareth. We also learn more about the work of the spirits of the light, as they, incarnated as human beings through many lives, have worked to give mankind greater skills in all matters, to make life on earth easier, and to give us greater knowledge about our true relation to God.

In the Concluding Summary, the whole story of the great work is told, and the spiritual guide of Johanne Agerskov confirms his identity from his last incarnation as her late father, Rasmus Malling-Hansen.

The Shorter Road on our wandering "Toward the Light" 
The third "golden fruit" was a book called The Doctrine of Atonement and the Shorter Road. The book's content seems to indicate that the shorter road means a direct rout (a straight path) rather than a short cut. In this book the spirit that was incarnated as Saul of Tarsus (later, Paul) seeks to dispel the dogma he created as Paul. This spirit was assisted with the message by other spiritual intelligences as he had just returned from his most recent incarnation. The spirit relays how he, in his own mind as Paul, formed the idea that Jesus' mission was about his death; a blood sacrifice that would atone for sin in order to save mankind. But now this spirit wants to tell us that he, himself, was the originator of this theory; that it never was Jesus' nor the Father's intention to die in order to save human and fallen spirits. "Salvation" for all had been declared from God but the "balancing of the scales" could be held up by believing "Jesus did it for me". In all this is finalized that once these heathen over toned and semi blasphemous ideas (i.e. human sacrifice to appease a god) are taken away, Christ would be seen in a true light as the true savior of all.

Paul had great love for Christ but was it is explained how the strained and partly broken relationship with the disciples who walked with Jesus, and the ingrained thoughts of sacrificial law working while he tried to figure out Jesus' death, as well as Satan "at his side" to distort and deceive were all parts of the forming of what has come to be believed as the basis for salvation. That spirit that was Paul now renders confirmation of the "high spirits" message that it was Christ's life of love, tolerance, and forgiveness that communicated further salvation from Darkness and the evil created from it. Salvation was declared by the Father since “Let there be Light”, so no work or suffering or belief could be considered any sort of earning one's salvation.

It was even the greatest part of the mission and Christ's intention while incarnated as Jesus to pray for Ardor (Satan, Christ's spiritual brother formerly known as Lucifer, which means bearer of the Light - Ardor has similar meaning but with more of the connotation of what not to do), for his repentance in love even up to the time of Satan's great torture upon him in the desert, known in a distorted version from the Bible as the temptation in the wilderness.  Since great love, as well as the actual act of committing evil, both create the ability to break the power of Darkness, it was the opportune time to “win his brother back” and Christ's death didn’t have to be. Instead, Christ, under the impossible burden, and in human anxiety, prayed for help for himself - the moment had passed where he could have won back Ardor or Satan.

Christ spent the next 2000 years (until 1912) pursuing his brother in compassionate, unfailing love, relying on the Father, doing what it took to convince him to return home. Ardor's return was required to be able to have the books (the "golden fruits") come out uncorrupted (as has happened with all "holy" books) so that everyone would know the "shorter road". This love of dedication and persistence was to demonstrate the true love of God, the love that forgives your enemy, the love that saves. It was not God but the church leaders, and the people who followed, who crucified Jesus, because they did not understand his message and Satan was inspiring them as well. It is stated that Jesus in no way died to atone for anyone's sins but because of the sin of the people (envy, pride, hatred) who delivered him up to be put to death.

This book also contains a speech by Christ, in which he asks us not to look upon him as God (as God "the Father" is a separate being), but as our beloved brother; and to turn to God, the true "Father" of our spirit, when we are in need of help or comfort. Surprisingly, God will supposedly consider, for example, someone's woe filled thoughts for the suffering of mankind as a prayer for help toward them even though one or both are "unbelievers".

The last part is the account of another spirit, who once was incarnated as Ignatius Loyola, a high priest of an ancient civilization. He, by experience, relays how we can take the shorter road toward the Light by forgiving even our enemies and everybody who has done wrong to us; and most of all, to forgive the fallen  spirits and their leader, now named Ardor, who are responsible for an existence started in Darkness and all suffering on earth. Explanation of forgiveness includes how the one giving forgiveness, not just the wrongdoer, will be freed of the "power of Darkness".

In reality, the Eldest (the fallen spirits, demons, the third of the angels that fell from heaven) have suffered and will suffer the most in total for the evil done and from the millions of years they have been without contact to God, their Father, convinced under the influence of Darkness, that God would not forgive but even do away with them. Clarification is made, though, that God had only grieved for them and longed for their return. The idea of a "wrath filled, vengeful God" came about by the workings of the fallen ones themselves.

Ardor, along with most of the fallen spirits (possibly all in the present day), have now turned away from their life of evil and returned to God and await their fate. They wait for forgiveness from their own creatures. The darkness is still present on earth, but no longer has a leader. In Toward the Light Ardor tells the true story about his fall into darkness, confessing all his gruesome evil doings. Now he asks us all if we can have the heart to forgive him and the rest. And if we do, we will participate in bringing themselves and all mankind a giant step "Toward the Light" and into the Kingdom.

It is not a short cut but a road made shorter by forgiving (a straight path instead of windy), in effect shortening the time of retribution and this part of mankind's existence on earth. For our sins and evil actions, they want us each to know that we must seek that remorse that desires forgiveness from those we have done wrong and find that forgiveness, making it right (balancing the scales), or meet the consequences of our actions in later incarnations. Christ's words about being born again were literal; meaning rebirth or reincarnation is part of the “Law of Retribution”. This law wasn't God's intention but is used for spiritual maturing and can be overridden by forgiveness or His law of love.

The planned reformation did not take place 
Toward the Light was sent to all the bishops of the Danish church and to 60 ministers. The Agerskovs had been told that the men to whom they sent the book had, before incarnating, promised to contribute to a reformation of the Danish church, based on the knowledge given in Toward the Light. But they all kept quiet, and even though Toward the Light had many followers among the common people, there was not much public interest in the book.

Even though the story of Toward the Light had started with Johanne and Michael Agerskov's interest in spiritism, they appealed to all spiritists to stop their activities and not to call upon their dead ancestors' spirits any more. They said that this only causes problems for the dead, as they need to rest and to make preparations for their next incarnation on earth. If the spirits of the light call upon us, we should be prepared to help them; otherwise God tells us not to try to call on the spirits of the dead.

In 1922 Michael Agerskov wrote the story about the events that had led to the creation of the "three fruits" in his book, Some Psychic Experiences. Toward the Light has been translated into several languages, including German, French, Italian, Spanish, Russian, Swedish and Norwegian.

In 1938, a letter was sent to all the bishops of Denmark, produced in the same manner as Toward the Light itself, urging the Church authorities in Denmark to communicate the truth about God to their congregations - and to the public at large.  This noble letter was met with silence. In the present day there are a number of translations of Toward the Light and its supplements; although it was inevitable that the books would be translated, because of this silence perhaps more significant initiatives outside of Denmark will be taken in support of the work than might otherwise have been the case. ("An Open Letter To All the Bishops of Denmark" is considered by the Foundation for Toward the Light to be genuine.)

References 
Hilsen til Danmark, Copenhagen 1915
Toward the Light, Copenhagen 1920
The Doctrine of Atonement and the Shorter Road, Copenhagen 1920
Some Psychic Experiences, by Michael Agerskov, Copenhagen 1922
Questions and answers I and II, Copenhagen 1929–30
Hvem var Skrivekuglens Opfinder? by Johanne Agerskov, Copenhagen 1925

External links
The Foundation for Toward the Light!
Toward the Light! online on many different languages
Unofficial website promoting Toward the Light!

1920 non-fiction books
Books about spirituality
Danish non-fiction books